Indo-Israeli Centre of Excellence for Animal Husbandary & Dairying, Hisar, will be built by Haryana State in collaboration with MASHAV. The centre will operate in the field of research and training for cost-effective and innovative localised animal husbandry in India and dairy technologies for the intensive dairy production system of global standards to enhance per capita availability of milk. It is located within the Government Livestock Farm at Hisar in Haryana state of India.

History
It will be established with a cost of INR 15 crore (150 million), based on a Memorandum of understanding signed between State Government of Haryana with MASHAV in April 2015.

Objectives

Haryana aims to be the leading state of the country in milk production. Israel, a leading country in terms of its dairy management techniques, can be a good model for the State to follow. Israel and India produce 36 liter and 6.868 liter milk per milch animal respectively. Israeli technical assistance can help Haryana become a leading state in terms of milk production.

See also

 List of universities and colleges in Hisar
 List of institutions of higher education in Haryana
 List of think tanks in India

References 

Universities and colleges in Hisar (city)
Agriculture in Haryana
Science and technology in Haryana
Research institutes in Hisar (city)
Agricultural universities and colleges in Haryana
Educational institutions established in 2017
Dairy farming in India
India–Israel relations
2017 establishments in Haryana